Regiane Kelly Lima Alves (born 31 August 1978) is a Brazilian actress. She is best known by her role as Dóris in TV Globo's telenovela Mulheres Apaixonadas.

Biography 

Born in Santo André, São Paulo metropolitan region. She is the daughter of the sales supervisor José Monteiro Alves and stay-at-home Maria Aparecida Alves Lima. From an early age became interested in the artistic career. In Children participated in poetry contests and dance festivals in college, always among the first three places.

Personal life 

Between 1996 and 1999 was married to Carlos Augusto Nogueira advertising, but divorced.

In 2000 she married assistant director André Felipe Binder, this marriage, but lasted until 2004, when the couple divorced.

In 2005 began a love affair with the musician Thiago Antunes and October 10, 2009, after four years together, the actress married him in Barra da Tijuca, west of the City of Rio de Janeiro. In May 2010 the actress confirmed her divorce from musician.

She was married to actor and filmmaker João Gimenez, son of Regina Duarte. On April 26, 2014, Regiane gives birth to her first son, João Gabriel, who was born through a cesarean. On August 26, 2015, she gave birth to her second son, Antônio.

Career

Television

Film

Theater

References

External links 

1978 births
Living people
Actresses from Santo André
Brazilian film actresses
Brazilian telenovela actresses
People from Santo André, São Paulo